I Will Stand is the fourth studio album by American country music singer Kenny Chesney. It was released on July 15, 1997 on BNA Records. "She's Got It All" was the album's first single, as well as Chesney's first Number One single on the Billboard country music charts. "A Chance", "That's Why I'm Here" and "I Will Stand" were all released as singles as well, peaking at number 11, number 2, and number 27, respectively, on the country charts. Also included is an acoustic rendition of Chesney's 1996 single "When I Close My Eyes". It is his first certified Gold album. This was Kenny's last album to have a neotraditional country sound before developing a more crossover-friendly country-pop sound. 

The track, Lonely, Needin' Lovin', was previously recorded and released by Woody Lee on his 1995 Atlantic album, Get Over It.

Critical reception
Stephen Thomas Erlewine rated the album four-and-a-half stars out of five on AllMusic, proclaiming that Chesney began to find his musical personality on the album.

Track listing

Personnel
As listed in liner notes.

Eddie Bayers – drums
Kenny Bell – acoustic guitar
Shannon Brown – background vocals
Larry Byrom – acoustic guitar
Melonie Cannon – background vocals
Kenny Chesney – lead vocals
Glen Duncan – fiddle, mandolin
Sonny Garrish – Dobro, steel guitar
Steve Gibson – electric guitar
Rob Hajacos – fiddle
Randy Howard – fiddle

Roy Huskey, Jr. – upright bass
Kirk "Jellyroll" Johnson – harmonica
George Jones – vocals on track 7
Tracy Lawrence – vocals on track 7
Brent Mason – electric guitar
Rodger Morris – piano, synthesizer
Farrell Morris – percussion
Steve Nathan – synthesizer, vibraphone
William "Ozzy" Osment – fiddle
Larry Paxton – bass guitar

Matt Rollings – piano, Hammond B-3 organ
John Wesley Ryles – background vocals
Pete Wade – gut string guitar
Cindy Richardson-Walker – background vocals
Biff Watson – acoustic guitar
Dennis Wilson – background vocals
Lonnie Wilson – drums
Norro Wilson – percussion
Curtis Young – background vocals
Reggie Young – electric guitar

Charts

Weekly charts

Year-end charts

Singles

Certifications

References

1997 albums
Kenny Chesney albums
BNA Records albums
Albums produced by Norro Wilson
Albums produced by Buddy Cannon